Acamptus is a genus of true weevils in the beetle family Curculionidae. There are about nine described species in Acamptus.

Species
These nine species belong to the genus Acamptus:
 Acamptus cancellatus Zimmerman, 1974
 Acamptus echinus Casey, 1892
 Acamptus exilipes Poinar & Legalov, 2015
 Acamptus interstitialis Hustache, 1936
 Acamptus orthodoxus Hustache, 1932
 Acamptus plurisetosus Zimmerman, 1974
 Acamptus rigidus LeConte, 1876
 Acamptus texanus (Sleeper, 1954)
 Acamptus verrucosus Voss, 1947

References

Further reading

 
 
 

Cossoninae
Articles created by Qbugbot